Opdyke is a census-designated place in the southeastern part of Jefferson County, Illinois, United States. As of the 2010 census, its population was 254.

History 

Opdyke was laid out in 1871, following construction of the St. Louis & Southeastern Railroad. The nearby, earlier town of Lynchburg was largely abandoned and moved to Opdyke.

A part of the railroad investment in this area was funded by a mortgage of $4,525,000 by Calhoun & Opdyke of New York. The town is named for Opdyke. It is possible that the name of the village is all that they got out of the investment.

The original surveys of Illinois, made around 1800, show the Goshen Road passing through what is now the center of Opdyke in a north/south direction.  The road was about a quarter mile east of the north/south section road that now forms the western boundary of the village.  Few traces of this road now remain, and it is not clear if the road was still present at the time of the founding of the village.

Opdyke formed as a village alongside the railroad tracks. The railroad is no longer a significant factor in the existence of the village, which now fronts on Illinois Route 142. Interstate 64 passes a mile north of the village, without an interchange.

Demographics

References

External links
TopoQuest map of Opdyke, IL
Original Surveys of Illinois

Census-designated places in Illinois
Census-designated places in Jefferson County, Illinois
Mount Vernon, Illinois micropolitan area
Populated places established in 1871
1871 establishments in Illinois